Spinning the Truth Around is the eleventh studio album by American band Blue October. It is a triple album, released in three separate parts. Part I was released on October 14, 2022. Part II is anticipated to be released in June 2023, with Part III to follow soon after. Part III will contain remixes and alternate versions of songs from Parts I and II.The title track was the first single, and was positively compared to Bruce Springsteen.

Track listing
Part I

Part II (forthcoming)

Personnel

 Justin Furstenfeld – vocals, guitar, producer
 Jeremy Furstenfeld – drums
 Matthew Ostrander – guitar
 Matt Noveskey – bass
 Ryan Delahoussaye – violin, keyboards
 Will Knaak - guitar
 Steve Schiltz – bass, vocals
 Eric Holtz – engineering, mixing
 Jayson Peters - Assistant Engineer, Piano
 Sus Vasquez - guitar
 Jenna Ren - vocals
 Benjamin Ruiz - vocals
 Mike Cross - vocals
 Jacqui Walker - vocals
 Gil Jenkins - vocals 
 Joanna Howerton - vocals
 Collin Friedli - vocals
 Dayne Reliford - Piano
 Phil Tan – mixing
 Chris Barber – album art
 Dave Arnold - photographer
 Tim Beck – album art
 Marshall Breedlove - assistant engineer
 Colin Leonard - mastering

References

2022 albums
Blue October albums